2006 Reunion Tour Live (or Th' 2006 Reunion Tour) is a 2006 live album by Th' Dudes during their October 2006 New Zealand reunion tour.  The album reached number 39 on the New Zealand music charts.

Track listing

Personnel
 Bass – Les White
 Drums – Bruce Hambling
 Guitar, keyboards, backing vocals – Ian Morris
 Guitar, vocals – Dave Dobbyn
 Vocals, percussion – Peter Urlich

Production
 Edited by Michael McKinley
 Mastered by Chris Van De Geer
 Mixed by Ian Morris
 Recorded by Ant Nevison
 Written by Dave Dobbyn (tracks: 1, 2, 4 to 7, 9 to 13), Ian Morris (tracks: 1, 2, 4 to 7, 9 to 13)

Notes
Live at The St. James Theatre, Auckland, NZ.

Mixed at IG Studios.

Chart positions

References 

2006 live albums
Th' Dudes live albums